The 2011–12 Lietuvos krepšinio lyga was the 19th season of the top-tier level professional basketball league of Lithuania, the Lietuvos krepšinio lyga (LKL). The regular season started in October 2011, and ended in January 2012

Participants 
Baltai
Juventus
Kėdainiai Triobet
Lietkabelis
Lietuvos rytas
Naglis
Neptūnas
Pieno žvaigždės
Rūdupis
Sakalai
Šiauliai
Žalgiris

Regular season

Playoffs

See also
VTB United League 2011–12
Baltic Basketball League 2011–12

External links 
 Lithuanian Basketball League

 
Lietuvos krepšinio lyga seasons
Lithuanian
LKL